James A. Rose (October 13, 1850 – May 29, 1912) was an American politician and educator.

Born in Golconda, Pope County, Illinois, Rose went to Illinois Normal State University in Normal, Illinois. He taught school in Pope County, was elected county superintendent of schools in 1873, and state's attorney in 1881. Rose was a Republican. Rose served as Illinois Secretary of State from 1897 until his death in 1912. Rose died in Springfield, Illinois as a result of a stomach hemorrhage.

Notes

1850 births
1912 deaths
People from Golconda, Illinois
Illinois State University alumni
Educators from Illinois
Illinois Republicans
Secretaries of State of Illinois
19th-century American politicians